Johann Rezac (27 April 1911 – 18 August 1998) was an Austrian architect. His work was part of the architecture event in the art competition at the 1936 Summer Olympics.

References

1911 births
1998 deaths
20th-century Austrian architects
Olympic competitors in art competitions